Dzerkalo Tyzhnia, usually referred to in English as the Mirror Weekly, was one of Ukraine's most influential analytical weekly-publisher newspapers, founded in 1994. On 27 December 2019 it published its last printed issue, it continued its life as a Ukrainian news website.

, its print circulation was 57,000.

Dzerkalo Tyzhnia offered political analysis, original interviews, and opinions on 32 pages. Originally published in Russian, since 2002 it was fully translated for the Ukrainian edition. Since 2001, main articles are also published in an online English-language version. All three language editions and archives are available online.

The paper is nonpartisan, while strongly liberal-leaning by Ukrainian standards. It maintains high journalistic standards. Dzerkalo Tyzhnia is partially funded by Western non-governmental organizations. The paper is widely read and highly regarded among Ukrainian business and political elites which largely explains its political influence.

In 2011, the newspaper changed owners and began to be published under the title «Information and Analytical Weekly "Mirror Weekly. Ukraine"».

On 27 December 2019, the last printed issue of the newspaper was published, with columns written by former Foreign Minister Pavlo Klimkin, oligarchs Victor Pinchuk, Konstantin Grigorishin, journalist , and other politicians, journalists and cultural figures.

The newspaper does, however, continue to be published online.

References

External links 
 

English-language newspapers published in Europe
Mass media in Kyiv
Publications established in 1994
Russian-language newspapers published in Ukraine
Ukrainian-language newspapers
Ukrainian news websites
Weekly newspapers published in Ukraine
Free Media Awards winners